A tractate is a written work dealing formally and systematically with a subject; the word derives from the Latin tractatus, meaning treatise.

One example of its use is in citing a section of the Talmud, when the term masekhet is used in conjunction with the name of the subject, for example, Masekhet Berakhoth, which is relevant to agriculture and blessings.

Two further examples are the 1670 and '76 Tractatus Theologico-Politicus by Baruch Spinoza, and the 1921 Tractatus Logico-Philosophicus by Ludwig Wittgenstein.

See also
 
 Minor tractate
 Tract (disambiguation)
 Tractatus (disambiguation)
 Treatise

References

Philosophical literature
Religious literature